Robert D. Drennan is an archaeologist who specializes in the development of sociopolitical complexity for prehistoric societies. He has carried out fieldwork in Mexico, Colombia, and China.

He received his Ph.D. in 1975 from the University of Michigan and in 2004 was admitted into the United States National Academy of Sciences. He is currently a Distinguished Professor at the Department of Anthropology of the University of Pittsburgh.

References

Living people
Year of birth missing (living people)
American archaeologists
University of Pittsburgh faculty
Members of the United States National Academy of Sciences
University of Michigan alumni